The 2021–22 season is Galatasaray's 110th season in the existence of the club. The team plays in the Basketball Super League and in the Basketball Champions League.

Overview

March
It has been announced that as of 18 March 2022, the paths parted with Ekrem Memnun, who has been working as the Head Coach of the Galatasaray Men's Basketball Team since January 2020-21 season.

As of 19 March 2022, Galatasaray Nef appointed Andreas Pistiolis, who was the first assistant coach in the CSKA Moscow technical staff, to the head coach. 

DeVaughn Akoon-Purcell, who had ruptured Achilles tendon in the Riesen Ludwigsburg match played on 23 March 2022, closed the season.

Team

Squad information

Depth chart

Transactions

In

|}

Out

|}

Coach

Staff and management

Pre-season and friendlies

Friendly match

Competitions

Overview

Basketball Super League

League table

Results summary

Results by round

Matches

''Note: All times are TRT (UTC+3) as listed by the Turkish Basketball Federation.

Playoffs

Quarterfinals

Semifinals

Basketball Champions League

Regular season

Regular Season Matches

Round of 16

Round of 16 Matches

Turkish Basketball Cup

Quarterfinals

Semifinals

References

Galatasaray S.K. (men's basketball) seasons
Galatasaray
2021–22 Basketball Champions League
Galatasaray Sports Club 2021–22 season